Customer delight is surprising a customer by exceeding their expectations and thus creating a positive emotional reaction. This emotional reaction leads to word of mouth. Customer delight directly affects sales and profitability of a company as it helps to distinguish the company and its products and services from the competition.
In the past customer satisfaction has been seen as a key performance indicator. Customer satisfaction measures the extent to which the expectations of a customer are met (compared to expectations being exceeded). However, it has been discovered that mere customer satisfaction does not create brand loyalty nor does it encourage positive word of mouth.

Customer delight can be created by the product itself, by accompanied standard services and by interaction with people at the front line. The interaction is the greatest source of opportunities to create delight as it can be personalized and tailored to the specific needs and wishes of the customer. During contacts with touch points in the company, more than just customer service can be delivered. The person at the front line can surprise by showing a sincere personal interest in the customer, offer small attentions that might please or find a solution specific to particular needs. Those front-line employees are able to develop a relationship between the customer and the brand. Elements in creating motivated staff are: recruiting the right people, motivating them continuously and leading them in a clear way.

Purpose of customer delight
There are three objectives when implementing Customer Delight:
 make customers loyal. As described by Sewell, that finding new customers costs 4 to 9 times more time and money than reselling to an existing client. It is thus commercially intelligent to retain as many clients as possible.
 have customers that are more profitable. Average delighted customers spend more with less hassle. As can be seen with the list of Van Setten, when all other elements are correct, clients accord less importance to price (as long as their perception of price remains reasonable).  
 have clients talk positively about your product, brand or shop, the so-called word of mouth. In a world of informed customers, 92% of customers consider word of mouth as the most reliable source of information. Delighted clients can be a valuable source of advertisement for a company.  

The effect of achieving those objectives, according to Reichheld & Markey as described in The Ultimate Question 2.0, only 9% of the world's major firms achieve real sustainable profit and growth over 10- year period from 1999 to 2009. Customer Delight is the only kind of growth that can be sustained over the long term according to Reichheld and Markey. The authors mention that their company Bain & Company have researched and concluded that a 5% increase in customer retention could yield anywhere between 25% to 100% increase in profits. The book explains the Net Promoter Score; a system which measures what customers are feeling and thus creating accountability for the customer experience.

In order to consistently deliver Customer Delight at all customer touch points throughout the company, a customer-centric corporate culture is key. With this corporate culture all processes, systems, people and leadership are aligned: everyone in the organization shares the same set of values, attitudes and practices. Developing the culture is a continuous exercise of innovation and improvement, involving every employee of the company. An absolutely necessary step is linking Customer Delight behaviour to the core values of the brand.  Core values are operating principles that guide an organization's internal conduct as well as its relationship with customers, partners and shareholders. Once core values are clearly outlined it is critical to incorporate them into every process, from hiring, to employee appraisals and decision making.

See also
Customer Service
Service quality
Customer Loyalty
Brand Management

References

Bibliography
Spoil 'em Rotten!, Five-Star Customer Delight in Action by Jane & Ted Coine, 
The Ultimate Question 2.0 (revised and expanded edition): How Net Promoter Companies Thrive in a Customer-Driven World, 
The New Gold Standard: 5 Leadership Principles for Creating a Legendary Customer Experience Courtesy of the Ritz-Carlton Hotel Company, 
"You make the difference", by Marieke van der Laan & Johannes van de Water, 

Customer experience
Business terms